Incolornis (meaning "inhabitant bird") is an extinct genus of basal birds from the Late Cretaceous (Coniacian, 89-86 mya). Remains have been found in the Bissekty Formation in Uzbekistan.
It is only known from fragmentary coracoids. The systematic position of the genus is unclear; it might have been an enantiornithine bird.

Two species are known, Incolonis silvae and Incolornis martini; the latter was initially placed in the genus Enantiornis. The estimated length of these animals was 135 mm for I. silvae and 220 mm for I. martini.

References

External links 

Bissekty Formation
Euenantiornitheans
Fossils of Uzbekistan
Fossil taxa described in 1998
Late Cretaceous birds of Asia
Prehistoric bird genera